
İnceburun  Lighthouse  is an active lighthouse on the Black Sea coast in Sinop Province, Turkey.

The masonry lighthouse was constructed in 1863 on İnceburun, on the cliffs of the northernmost point of Anatolia. The -tall lighthouse tower with a gallery around the lantern room has the form of an octagonal prism in the upper half sitting on a square-plan base, and is white painted. A one-story keeper's house is attached to it, and three additional buildings belong to the light station.

The lighthouse is accessible but the tower is closed to the public. The lighthouse keeping is served by Family Çilesiz, who do the job in fifth generation.

References

Buildings and structures in Sinop Province
Lighthouses in Turkey
Lighthouses completed in 1863
1863 establishments in the Ottoman Empire
Lighthouses of the Black Sea
Tourist attractions in Sinop Province